This page lists ensembles that specialise in contemporary classical music.

 Ahn Trio
 Alarm Will Sound
 American Modern Ensemble
 Arditti Quartet
 Ascolta
 Asko/Schönberg
 Athelas Sinfonietta Copenhagen
 Australia Ensemble
 AXIOM Ensemble
 Balanescu Quartet
 Bang on a Can All Stars 
 Birmingham Contemporary Music Group
 BIT20 Ensemble
 Canadian Brass
 California EAR Unit
 Concorde
 Corigliano Quartet
 Crash Ensemble
 Da Capo Chamber Players
 Del Sol Quartet
 Duo46
 Dynamis Ensemble
 eighth blackbird
 ELISION Ensemble
 Endymion
 Ensamble Kaparilo
 Ensemble 10/10
 Ensemble Alternance
 Ensemble Ars Nova
Ensemble Contemporain de Montréal
 Ensemble Dal Niente
 Ensemble for Intuitive Music Weimar
 Ensemble InterContemporain
 Ensemble l'Itinéraire
 Ensemble Modern
 Ensemble Recherche
 Ensemble Sortisatio 
 Ensemble Studio6 
 Ethel
 Fires of London
 Gamelan Son of Lion
 Group 180
 Hilliard Ensemble
 Hoketus
 Hyperion Ensemble
 Icebreaker
 Ictus Ensemble
 International Contemporary Ensemble
 Klangforum Wien
 Kronos Quartet
 Los Angeles Electric 8
 London Contemporary Orchestra
 London Sinfonietta
 Melos Ensemble
 MusikFabrik
 Nash Ensemble
 New York New Music Ensemble
 Newband
 Nouvel Ensemble Moderne
 Orchestra 2001
 Oslo Sinfonietta
 Les Percussions de Strasbourg
 Philip Glass Ensemble
 Piano Circus
 Present Music
 Project Trio
 Psappha New Music Ensemble
 Quince Ensemble
 Red Note Ensemble
 Relâche
 Sentieri selvaggi
 S.E.M. Ensemble
 Silesian String Quartet
 Smith Quartet
 So Percussion
 Sond'Ar-te Electric Ensemble
 Speculum Musicae
 Symphony Number One
 Synchronos Ensemble
 Tambuco
 Theatre of Voices
 Thelema Trio
 Topology
 Toimii
 Steve Reich and Musicians (Steve Reich Ensemble)
 Threnody Ensemble
 University of Chicago Contemporary Chamber Players
 Uusinta Ensemble
 Xenakis Ensemble
 Ensemble Metamorphosis

References